The 1967–68 season was Manchester City F.C.'s seventy-sixth season of league football, and second consecutive season in the Football League First Division. In the third full season under the management of Joe Mercer and Malcolm Allison, Manchester City were unfancied at the start of the season following a mid-table finish in 1966–67 Following the signing of forward Francis Lee, the club embarked on an unbeaten run that saw the club challenge at the top of the table. A televised victory against Tottenham Hotspur in snowy conditions proved particularly notable, becoming known as the Ballet on Ice.

Going into the final match of the season, Manchester City led the table. A 4–3 win at Newcastle United clinched the club's second league title, winning the First Division by two clear points over club rivals Manchester United. The league championship was the first trophy of the most successful period in Manchester City's history. Under Mercer and Allison, the club won a further three trophies in the following two seasons.

Background and pre-season
The 1966–67 season had been Manchester City's first in the top flight after winning promotion from the Second Division in 1966. A fifteenth-place finish consolidated the club's place in the division. Club captain Johnny Crossan struggled with injuries in 1966–67, and was sold to Middlesbrough for £34,500 in the close season. Tony Book succeeded him as captain. The club made no major signings before the start of the season, though Tony Coleman, a winger with a wild off-field reputation, had arrived from Doncaster Rovers at the tail-end of the 1966–67 season. Mercer had reservations about signing Coleman, but Allison convinced Mercer that he could pacify a man he once described as "the nightmare of a delirious probation officer". City also attempted to sign England international goalkeeper Gordon Banks, but were outbid by Stoke City.

The team travelled to Europe in pre-season, playing friendlies against Eintracht Braunschweig and Standard Liège. After returning to England they played Portsmouth at Fratton Park, winning 2–0, and finished their preparations with a resounding home win against Borussia Dortmund. Between matches, the players followed a fitness plan created by former athlete Joe Lancaster, under instruction from Malcolm Allison. The training regime was initially unpopular with the players; the severity of the first session caused some players to vomit.

Football League First Division
City's season opened with a 0–0 draw at home to Liverpool. City were awarded a penalty, but new captain Tony Book hit it wide. Two defeats followed, at Southampton and Stoke. The Stoke defeat led to a tactical switch. Mike Summerbee, who played wide on the right at the start of the season, was moved to centre-forward. The change reaped immediate dividends, with Summerbee playing a leading role in a 4–2 win against Southampton. This was the first in a run of five straight wins, after which Manchester City had caught up with the league leaders. During this run of wins young winger Stan Bowles made his league debut, scoring twice in a 5–2 win against Sheffield United.

Manchester City's first transfer business of the season brought goalkeeper Ken Mulhearn to the club from Stockport County on 21 September, a deal that involved City's back-up goalkeeper Alan Ogley moving in the opposite direction. Harry Dowd kept goal in the next match, a 1–0 defeat at Arsenal, but then dislocated a finger, prompting a debut for Mulhearn in the season's first Manchester derby. Mulhearn was reputedly so nervous before the match that Allison locked him in the medical room until he calmed down. Colin Bell scored the opener after five minutes, but two Bobby Charlton goals meant a win for Manchester United. In the second half of the match, Bowles exchanged punches with Brian Kidd, though neither man was sent off, largely thanks to the intervention of their respective captains. The derby loss was followed by a third consecutive defeat, at Sunderland.

A couple of days after the Roker Park defeat, Manchester City completed the signing of centre-forward Francis Lee from Bolton Wanderers for a club record £60,000. During negotiations Mercer stated to Lee that "we feel we've got the start of a good side. We are just one player short, and we think you are that player." Lee made his debut in a 2–0 win at home to Wolverhampton Wanderers, the start of an 11 match unbeaten run, including a 6–0 win against Leicester City.

Ballet on Ice
Midway through their unbeaten run, City faced Tottenham Hotspur at home in snowy conditions, in a match televised on Match of the Day. As the teams came out onto the frozen pitch, commentator Kenneth Wolstenholme called the Manchester City team as "the most exciting team in England". Aided by a modification to the studs on their boots suggested by Tony Book, City produced one of their best footballing performances in their history. One Spurs player was quoted as saying, "It was extraordinary. City moved like Olympic speed skaters while we were falling around like clowns on a skid patch." Tottenham took an early lead through Jimmy Greaves, but Bell equalised before half-time, and in the second half City besieged Tottenham, scoring three more times to win 4–1. After the match City trailed the league leaders by only a single point.

The match was named as Match of the Day'''s "Match of the Season", and as the only match at Maine Road that season to be recorded for television, is the foremost recorded example of the 1967–68 team in action.

The unbeaten run came to an end at Christmas, with back-to-back defeats in matches against West Bromwich Albion causing the club to fall to fourth place. The team commenced 1968 with a seven match unbeaten run, starting with consecutive 3–0 wins at Nottingham Forest and Sheffield United, and culminating in a 5–1 defeat of Fulham to go top of the table. The run came to an end with a defeat at Don Revie's Leeds United, which also meant City were overtaken at the top of the table by local rivals Manchester United. A visit to United's Old Trafford ground then followed. United took an early lead, but City rallied to win 3–1.

In late April, after City won 1–0 against Sheffield Wednesday and title rivals Manchester United lost to West Bromwich Albion, City were in a position where winning their final three games would all but guarantee the championship. In the first of the three, a home match against Everton, City won 2–0 in a match featuring Tony Book's first league goal for the club. Next was Tottenham Hotspur at White Hart Lane. City took a 3–0 lead before half time, eventually winning 3–1.

Title decider at Newcastle
Going into the final match, City were level on points with neighbours Manchester United, with City holding the advantage in goal average – the first decider if teams finished level on points – but needing to win to be sure of staying above their cross-city rivals. Liverpool were three points behind, but had a game in hand, so could still win the title if both City and United faltered. City faced tenth-placed Newcastle United at St James' Park; United were at home to bottom-half Sunderland. Bookmakers made United slight favourites for the title.

Mike Summerbee opened the scoring on 13 minutes, but Newcastle soon equalised. Neil Young made it 2–1, but again Newcastle equalised. A second strike by Young was disallowed for offside, and at half-time the score was 2–2. Straight after half-time Young scored again, and Francis Lee scored a fourth on 63 minutes. A late Newcastle goal set up a nervy finish, but City held on to win 4–3 and secure the title. The win was compounded by a 2–1 victory by Sunderland over Manchester United, giving City the title. Liverpool won one of their remaining games but lost the other, missing their chance to leapfrog United into second by one point.

Matches

Results summary

FA Cup
As a top-flight side, Manchester City entered the FA Cup in the third round, and were drawn at home to Reading of the Third Division. With City unusually wearing their maroon change kit, the match finished goalless, with Tony Coleman missing a penalty. The replay at Elm Park was a one-sided affair. City won 7–0, Mike Summerbee scoring a hat-trick. In the fourth round, another home tie finished 0–0, this time against Leicester City. In the replay Manchester City squandered a 2–0 lead and lost 4–3.

League Cup
Manchester City's League Cup run saw two notable debuts for young players. In the Second round against Leicester City, Stan Bowles scored twice in a 4–0 win. In the next round against Blackpool, Joe Corrigan made the first of his 605 appearances for the club. City progressed after a replay. Fulham were the opponents in the Fourth round, meaning City visited Craven Cottage for the second time in as many weeks. However, they could not replicate their league win, and lost 3–2.

Squad statistics

SquadAppearances for competitive matches only''
Source:

Transfers

In

Out

Legacy
The league championship was Manchester City's first trophy since the 1956 FA Cup. The triumph was the first of the most successful period in the club's history. Under Mercer and Allison the club went on to win the FA Cup in 1969, and the League Cup and European Cup Winners' Cup in 1970. The Mercer-Allison partnership changed in October 1971, with Allison taking the manager's role, and came to an end in June 1972 when Mercer left to take charge of Coventry City.

As a result of the title win, Manchester City entered European competition for the first time. However, Malcolm Allison's prediction that the club would "terrify Europe" proved inaccurate, with the club losing to Fenerbahçe in the first round of the European Cup.

See also
Manchester City F.C. seasons

References

Bibliography

External links
Extensive Manchester City statistics site

Manchester City F.C. seasons
Manchester City F.C.
English football championship-winning seasons